William Burrell (1938? – March 22, 1998) was an American football player at the University of Illinois.

A linebacker and guard, in 1959 Burrell won the Chicago Tribune Silver Football as the MVP of the Big Ten Conference. Burrell also finished fourth as a  Heisman Trophy candidate that year, and was a consensus All-American.

Burrell was drafted by the Buffalo Bills in the 1960 American Football League Draft, and by the St. Louis Cardinals in the fifth round of the 1960 NFL Draft.

He played for the Saskatchewan Roughriders of the Canadian Football League, and was that team's nominee for the Schenley Award as Outstanding Lineman in 1960.

Burrell is an alumnus of  Central High School in Clifton, Illinois.

The football field at Central High was named Bill Burrell Field on September 15, 2017.

Bill Burrell is included in The Pigskin Club of Washington, D.C. National Intercollegiate All-American Football Players Honor Roll.

Bill Burrell died on March 22, 1998.

References 

1930s births
1998 deaths
All-American college football players
American football linebackers
Illinois Fighting Illini football players
People from Iroquois County, Illinois